This is a list of torch designs used to carry the Olympic flame at the Olympic Games.

Summer Olympic torch designs

Winter Olympic torch designs

Summer Paralympic torch designs

Winter Paralympic torch designs

Summer Youth Olympic torch designs

Winter Youth Olympic torch designs

Footnotes

Notes

References

Olympic flame
Olympic torch relays
Paralympic torch relays